Streptomyces javensis is a bacterium species from the genus of Streptomyces.

See also 
 List of Streptomyces species

References

Further reading 
 
 

javensis
Bacteria described in 2001